Rusdi Kirana (born 17 August 1963) is an Indonesian businessman. He is the founder of Indonesian budget no-frills airline Lion Air which introduced both domestic and international flights, using the slogan, "We make people fly". On January 19, 2015, he was chosen by President Joko Widodo to become a member of the Presidential Advisory Council. In the political field, since January 12, 2014, he served as Deputy Chairperson of the National Awakening Party.

Biography 

Rusdi started his aviation business in October 1999. With an initial capital of US$10 million, he initiated the "revolution" in the world of aviation with a low cost carrier concept. The breakthrough was causing trouble for other airlines. In just six years, Lion had 24 aircraft consisting of 19 MD-80 and five DHC-8-301 aircraft. In terms of passenger numbers, Lion won over 600,000 people per month or controlled 40% of all market segments. In 2004 Lion Air took second place in number of passengers transported, behind Garuda Indonesia.
He continues to develop Lion Air's businesses and intends to become a market leader in domestic flights. So he continued to prepare for the start of infrastructure, flight routes, to increase the number of aircraft.

For infrastructure, Rusdi cooperated with the TNI AU and PT Dirgantara Indonesia, hiring a hangar at Husein Sastranegara International Airport, Bandung to use as a maintenance facility for Lion Air. He also bought a used airplane simulator from Scandinavian Airlines to train his pilots. In addition, Lion Air cooperates with the Indonesian Air Force to become the manager of Halim Perdanakusuma International Airport, Jakarta. It is likely that Lion Air's will switch its base to that airport.

In 2017, Rusdi was appointed as Indonesia's Ambassador to Malaysia.

References

External links 
 Profil di Tokohindonesia.com

Ambassadors of Indonesia to Malaysia
Indonesian diplomats
Indonesian people of Chinese descent
Indonesian Christians
Indonesian businesspeople
1963 births
Living people